Rockfest was an outdoor, hard rock and metal music festival held annually by Kansas City radio station KQRC-FM 98.9 The Rock since 1992. Over the years, the festival was held at various venues around the city, including Liberty Memorial Park, Kansas Speedway, and Sandstone Amphitheater. As of 2010, it was considered North America's largest one-day music festival. Major bands such as Godsmack, Staind, Seether, Stone Temple Pilots, Korn,  Alice in Chains, Rob Zombie, and Disturbed  have all headlined Rockfest. The large size and rain-or-shine ethos of the concert led to community disputes regarding its continuation.

In 2017, Rockfest was held at Kansas Speedway instead of Liberty Memorial Park due to inclement weather in previous years, making the original venue unsuitable.

In 2019, it was announced that Rockfest would be postponed until 2020. No official announcement was made regarding the postponement aside from a brief spot on the radio station and on Facebook, confusing many and giving rise to rumors. The primary reason cited by organizers was that the costs for big-name bands was too high.

A statement was made on 13 February 2020, announcing there would not be a Rockfest that year. It was decided that 2018 would be the final year for the festival.

Event lineup

References

External links
 Rockfest at 98.9 The Rock

Heavy metal festivals in the United States
Rock festivals in the United States
Music festivals established in 1992